Whittenburg is a surname. Notable people with the surname include:

Dereck Whittenburg (born 1960), American basketball player and coach
Donnell Whittenburg (born 1994), American artistic gymnast
Jim Whittenburg (born 1946), American historian
Roy Whittenburg (1913–1980), American businessman and newspaper publisher

See also
Whittenburg, Texas, a ghost town in Hutchinson County, Texas, United States
Whittenburg Creek, a river of Crawford County, Missouri, United States